Sir William Goscombe John  (21 February 1860 – 15 December 1952) was a prolific Welsh sculptor known for his many public memorials. As a sculptor, John developed a distinctive style of his own while respecting classical traditions and forms of sculpture. He gained national attention with statues of eminent Victorians in London and Cardiff and subsequently, after both the Second Boer War and World War I, created a large number of war memorials. These included the two large group works, The Response 1914 in Newcastle upon Tyne and the Port Sunlight War Memorial which are considered the finest sculptural ensembles on any British monument.

Although as a young man he adopted the first name Goscombe, taken from the name of a village in Gloucestershire near his mother's home, he was actively engaged with his native Wales and Welsh culture throughout his career.

Biography

Early life and career 
John was born in the Canton area of Cardiff, to Thomas John, a wood carver from Llantrithyd and Elizabeth (née Smith), from Randwick, Gloucestershire. As a youth John assisted his father in the restoration of Cardiff Castle and Castell Coch during 1874 which was being overseen by William Burges. He initially studied in his home town, attending the Cardiff School of Art throughout the 1870s and also took anatomy classes from a local painter. 

John moved to London in 1881 and worked as a pupil-assistant in the studio of Thomas Nicholls, Burges' architectural carver. John then studied at the South London School of Technical Art under Jules Dalou and William Silver Frith and then at the Royal Academy schools, where he won the gold medal and a travelling scholarship in 1887. Throughout 1890 and 1891 he travelled in Europe and Africa and, in 1891, took a studio in Paris where he studied with Auguste Rodin. John's statuette, Morpheus clearly reflected the influence of Rodin on his development and the piece received an honourable mention when shown at the Paris Salon in 1892. Following the success of Morpheus, John created a series of exhibition pieces that embraced the naturalistic style of the New Sculpture movement and cemented his reputation. John the Baptist, 1894, a life-sized figure cast in block tin for Lord Bute won a gold medal at the 1900 Paris Exhibition. 

Other notable works from this period included Girl Binding her Hair, 1893, The Elf, 1898 and A Boy at Play, 1895. A Boy at Play was subsequently purchased by the Chantrey Bequest for the Tate. The Elf was highly praised when shown at the Royal Academy in 1898 and was subsequently reproduced both in bronze and marble to become among John's most popular works. John received gold medals from the Paris Salon in 1892 and, for his statue of the Duke of Devonshire, in 1901.

Major works
By the early 1900s John had established himself as a sculptor of some note and began to receive significant public commissions. Although based in London, John won a number of large commissions in his native Wales. He designed the Hirlas Horn for the 1898 National Eisteddfod of Wales and a set of ceremonial tools to mark the building of the National Museum Wales in Cardiff. For the monument, unveiled in 1899 and known as The Girl, to Welsh poets and preachers at Llansannan, John depicted a girl in modern clothing wrapped in a traditional Welsh cloak. The creation of that monument had been promoted by the Welsh nationalist Thomas Edward Ellis and when he died, also in 1899, John was selected to sculpt his memorial statue which was unveiled at Bala in 1903 by David Lloyd George. John's statue of the shipping magnate and philanthropist John Cory was erected in Cathays Park in the centre of Cardiff and is one of several statues by him in, or near, the park. These include the 1906 bronze statue of Lord Tredegar which was John's first equestrian statue. His 1916 marble St David Blessing the People is also nearby in the Marble Hall of Cardiff City Hall.

John received a further number of national and international commissions, including several for war memorials. John's 1905 King's Regiment Boer War memorial in St John's Gardens, Liverpool depicts two soldiers of the regiment from different historical periods, one from the 17th century and one from the Boer War period, around a figure of Britannia on a pedestal. John created a similar representation of a regiment's heroic traditions for the 1924 Royal Welch Fusiliers memorial at Wrexham which features statues of 18th and 20th century soldiers. On the reverse of the Liverpool monument is a sculpture featuring a regimental drummer boy of 1743. This was subsequently cast as a separate, small bronze in an edition for the retail market and became a popular purchase while a monumental version was also cast and is held by the National Museum Wales.

Before the outbreak of the First World War, John had been commissioned to create a memorial to the 244 engineers who had died with the sinking of the RMS Titanic in 1912. When the monument was completed in 1916, and erected in Liverpool, it was dedicated to all engineers and engine room workers lost at sea, including those killed during the war.

John was commissioned by Lord Leverhulme to design a memorial at Port Sunlight to the 500 plus employees of Lever Brothers Ltd who had died in the First World War. John exhibited a variety of sketches and maquettes for the memorial at the Royal Academy in 1919 and 1920 but left the final selection of figures to Leverhulme. The monument consists of a cross on an octagonal base on an elevated podium. There are large bronze sculptural groups with a total of 11 figures and 12 relief panels on the podium. The main sculpture group shows three soldiers, one shielding a child and one lying wounded with a figure of a nurse approaching him. The sculptural group on the rear of the podium consists of a mother figure with infants and other children. The relief panels on the podium sides show pairs of children carrying wreaths plus panels showing combat scenes including machine gunners in a trench and action stations on the bridge of a warship. The monument was greatly praised for its depiction of military and civilian roles, Nicholas Pevsner described the monument as "genuinely moving and avoids sentimentality".

The Port Sunlight memorial was unveiled in 1921, two years before John's Northumberland Fusiliers Memorial was erected in Newcastle upon Tyne. Known as "The Response 1914" the monument was commissioned to mark the raising of four battalions of volunteers by the local Chamber of Commerce at the start of World War I. In bronze, John created a procession of deep-relief figures representing the volunteers and those they were leaving behind. The procession is led  a winged angel, an allegory of renown, blowing a horn above two drummer boys followed by uniformed soldiers and men in civilian clothes, some of whom are saying goodbye to women and children. Although created several years after the end of the war, the monument illustrates the mood of patriotic confidence and resolve that had marked a period at the start of the conflict ten years earlier and makes the work deeply poignant. Writing in 1991, Alan Borg, a former director of the Imperial War Museum described the Port Sunlight and Newcastle memorials as the finest sculptural ensembles on any British monument.

Personal life
John was made a Royal Academician in 1909 and became a corresponding member of the Institut de France. He first exhibited at the Royal Academy in London in 1886 and continued to do so annually until 1948. In 1942 he was awarded the gold medal of the Royal Society of Sculptors. He was knighted at Caernarfon Castle in 1911 during the investiture of Edward VIII as the Prince of Wales for which he designed elements of the regalia and a medal. John was influential in the development of the National Museum of Wales, having served on its governing council for over forty years and donated numerous art works to the Museum.

In August 1890, John married the Swiss-born Marthe Weiss. Their daughter Muriel married Frederick Luke Val Fildes, the son of the artist Sir Luke Fildes.
From 1892 John lived at Greville Road, Kilburn, London (in a house that had previously belonged to Seymour Lucas), and is buried in Hampstead Cemetery. The memorial statue of his wife, which he designed when she died in 1923, was stolen from the cemetery in 2001 and recovered after a few months; it was then put into storage, but was stolen again in 2007.

Public monuments and memorials

1890–1899

1900–1909

1910–1919

1920–1929

1930 and later

Other works

John exhibited medals on at least seven occasions at the Royal Academy between 1898 and 1918. He designed the medal for the 1911 investiture of Edward VIII as Prince of Wales and the King George V Silver Jubilee Medal in 1935.  During his career John also produced medals and seals for several organisations in Wales. These included medal designs for the Cardiff School of Art and the Welsh Nursing Association plus seals for the National Museum Wales, the Merthyr Tydfil Corporation and the Church of Wales. For the National Eisteddfod Association he designed a medal with bardic images.

John's output was prolific and also includes monuments to Lord Salisbury in Westminster Abbey and at St Etheldreda's Church, Hatfield. John's output also included:
 Sculptures on Electra House in Moorgate, City of London, dating from 1900 to 1903 and representing Egypt, Japan, India and China.
 The work Grief dating to 1890.
 Figures of Edward VII and Queen Alexandra on the facade of the Victoria and Albert Museum, 1906.
 Carved figures on a reredos in St John the Baptist Church, Cardiff.
 Designed the regalia for the investiture of the Prince of Wales at Caernarfon in 1911.
 Merlin and Arthur (c. 1896), a bronze in the collection of the National Museum Wales which was exhibited at the Royal Academy in 1902. 
 Memorial relief to Canon Guy D.D, (1897) in Llandaff Cathedral.
 Bust of the artist John Macallan Swan.
 Bust of Frederick Stanley, Earl of Derby in Preston Town Hall.
 Bust of Lewis Morris, exhibited in 1899 at the Royal Academy.
 Marble statue of Sir John Woodburn, erected Uttar Pradesh 1906, placed in storage at the Uttar Pradesh State Museum during 1958–59
 Marble statue of Sir Digbijai Singh, erected Lucknow 1907, moved to State Museum Lucknow during 1981–82
 Bronze equestrian statue of Gilbert Elliot-Murray-Kynynmound, 4th Earl of Minto, Viceroy of India, erected 1914 at Kolkata and subsequently moved to Barrackpore
 1915 memorial relief panel in copper and bronze to Sir Patrick Playfair, 1852–1915, St. Paul's Cathedral, Kolkata

References

External links 

 
 John, Sir William Goscombe (1860–1952) Article on Goscombe John's work with images from The National Archives.
 Works by John in the National Museum of Wales collection

1860 births
1952 deaths
19th-century Welsh sculptors
19th-century Welsh male artists
20th-century Welsh sculptors
20th-century Welsh male artists
Alumni of Cardiff School of Art and Design
Alumni of the City and Guilds of London Art School
Artists from Cardiff
Burials at Hampstead Cemetery
Knights Bachelor
People associated with Amgueddfa Cymru – Museum Wales
Recipients of the Order of Leopold II
Royal Academicians
Welsh male sculptors